Trifurcula luteola is a moth of the family Nepticulidae. It is known from the Mediterranean region in south-western France.

The wingspan is 5.6-6.7 mm for males. Adults were found in July and August.

External links
Nepticulidae and Opostegidae of the world

Nepticulidae
Moths of Europe
Moths described in 1990